Khanlar Qeshlaqi may refer to:
 Khanlar Qeshlaqi Hajj Bala Beyglu
 Khanlar Qeshlaqi-ye Hajj Alam Qoli